Colin Francis Holt (27 April 1934 – 3 November 2018) was an Australian rules footballer who played with Carlton and Richmond in the Victorian Football League (VFL).

On 3 November 2018, Holt died aged 84.

Notes

External links 

Colin Holt's profile at Blueseum

1934 births
2018 deaths
Carlton Football Club players
Richmond Football Club players
Australian rules footballers from Victoria (Australia)
Brunswick Football Club players